Hale Corner is an unincorporated community located in the town of Otter Creek, Eau Claire County, Wisconsin, United States. The community was named for its first known settler, Charles H. Hale, who came from Maine in 1856.

Notes

Unincorporated communities in Eau Claire County, Wisconsin
Unincorporated communities in Wisconsin